Darlington was an electoral district of the Legislative Assembly in the Australian state of New South Wales, named after the inner Sydney suburb of Darlington. It was first created in 1894 and abolished in 1904.

History
Prior to 1894 the suburb of Darlington was part of the Redfern which returned four members. Multi-member constituencies were abolished in the 1893 redistribution, resulting in the creation of 76 new districts, including Darlington. Redfern was reduced in size and parts were given to the new districts of Darlington and Waterloo. The district was proposed to be called Redfern West, before the name Darlington was chosen. The suburb was regarded as a slum and was the most densely populated suburb of Sydney.

Darlington was abolished in 1904 as a result of the 1903 New South Wales referendum which reduced the number of members of the Legislative Assembly from 125 to 90 and was largely absorbed by the new districts of Phillip and Camperdown.

Members for Darlington

Election results

References

Former electoral districts of New South Wales
Constituencies established in 1894
Constituencies disestablished in 1904
1894 establishments in Australia
1904 disestablishments in Australia